Sejong most commonly refers to:
Sejong the Great, the fourth king of Joseon
Sejong City, a planned city in South Korea

Sejong may also refer to:

Places
Sejongno, street that runs through Jongno-gu in downtown Seoul

Ships
Sejong the Great-class destroyer

Other uses
7365 Sejong, main-belt asteroid
King Sejong Institute, cultural institution
King Sejong Station, research station for the Korea Antarctic Research Program
King Sejong the Great (TV series), South Korean television series
Korea University Sejong Campus, Korea University 's second campus
Sejong Center, largest arts and cultural complex in Seoul 
Sejong Institute, foreign & security think tank
Sejong University, private university located in Seoul
Sejong (constituency), constituency of the National Assembly of South Korea

See also
Oh Se-jong (1982–2016), South Korean short track speed skater
Cho Se-jong (born 1978), South Korean sport shooter
Byun Se-jong (born 1998), South Korean figure skater

Sekong (disambiguation)